The 2009 Copa Sevilla was a professional tennis tournament played on outdoor yellow clay courts. It was the seventh edition of the tournament which was part of the 2009 ATP Challenger Tour. It took place in Sevilla, Spain between 7 and 13 September 2009.

Singles main draw entrants

Seeds

 Rankings are as of August 31, 2009.

Other entrants
The following players received wildcards into the singles main draw:
  Agustín Boje-Ordóñez
  Carlos Boluda-Purkiss
  Steven Diez
  Alberto Rodríguez-Cervantes

The following players received entry from the qualifying draw:
  Enrico Burzi
  Guillermo Olaso
  Albert Ramos-Viñolas
  Gabriel Trujillo-Soler

Champions

Singles

 Pere Riba def.  Albert Ramos-Viñolas, 7–6(2), 6–2

Doubles

 Treat Conrad Huey /  Harsh Mankad def.  Alberto Brizzi /  Simone Vagnozzi, 6–1, 7–5

External links
Official site
ITF Search